The Round Hill School for Boys was a short-lived experimental school in Northampton, Massachusetts. It was founded by George Bancroft and Joseph Cogswell in 1823. Though it failed as a viable venture — it closed in 1834 — it was an early effort to elevate secondary education in the United States for the sons of the New England elite. The incompatibility of the two founders was a fundamental cause of the eventual dissolution of the project.

School founding
On his return from the University of Göttingen, wishing to shed upon others some of the inspiration he had received, George Bancroft applied for leave to read lectures on history at Harvard University. His request was denied. After this disappointment, in an attempt to introduce some parts of the German system of education to the United States, and in conjunction with Joseph Cogswell, Bancroft founded the Round Hill School. He left the school after a few years, leaving Cogswell in sole possession.

Early years
During the first eight years of its history, it enrolled 293 pupils, drawn from 19 states and four foreign countries. The conductors of Round Hill put into practice ideas they had gathered in Germany, England, and Switzerland. In Switzerland, Cogswell had studied the schools of the two educators, Johann Heinrich Pestalozzi at Yverdon, and Philipp Emanuel von Fellenberg at the estate of Hofwyl near Bern. He was impressed by the good order and success of the institution of Fellenberg even more than by that of Pestalozzi. The companionship of teacher and pupil, study mingled with play, uniform development, attention to the study of modern languages — these principles impressed him forcibly, and he introduced them later at his own Round Hill School. The German system also included the abolition, as far as possible, of fear and emulation. The lash was forbidden, out-of-door life was emphasized as a feature, while individual attention given to each pupil was employed as a stimulus instead of rivalry. All these ideas were subsequently put into practice at Round Hill. It was the first school in the country thoroughly impressed with the German ideas.

Scholars and closing
The Round Hill School secured German scholar Charles Beck in February 1824 shortly after he arrived with Charles Follen on the same ship the previous Christmas. Beck was appointed teacher of Latin, and he soon established at Round Hill the first gym and the first school gymnastics program in the United States. The gym was an outdoor facility. Follen was a visitor at Round Hill, and in November 1824 proceeded to Harvard to teach German.

Benjamin Peirce, Timothy Walker and Stiles French served in succession as the school's teacher of mathematics.

The school was comparable to a German gymnasium.  It closed in 1834 due to financial difficulties and overwork on the part of Cogswell.

Alumni
Edward Clifford Anderson, American Civil War general (Confederate)
Thomas Gold Appleton, Boston wit and litterateur
Henry W. Bellows, Unitarian clergyman, reformer
Francis Boott, composer
Ellery Channing, poet 
George Edward Ellis, Unitarian clergyman
John Murray Forbes, merchant, philanthropist, founder of the modern Milton Academy
George Gibbs, ethnologist, geologist and naturalist
Philip Kearny, American Civil War general (Union)
Robert Traill Spence Lowell, clergyman, headmaster of St. Mark's School (1869-1874)
Rev. Samuel May Jr. (b. 1810), Unitariam clergyman, abolitionist, cousin of Samuel Joseph May
John Lothrop Motley, historian and diplomat
George W. Riggs, financier
Theodore Sedgwick, law writer
George Cheyne Shattuck, founder of St. Paul's School
Nathaniel B. Shurtleff, mayor of Boston
Samuel Cutler Ward, American lobbyist
Josiah Whitney, geologist
Charles Storer Storrow, prominent American civil engineer and industrialist

Notes

References
Albert Bernhardt Faust, The German Element in the United States (2 vols.), Boston:  Houghton Mifflin, 1909, vol. II, chap. V, pp. 214–215 at archive.org. This source describes the gymnasium as an indoor facility.
Bassett, John S. "The Round Hill School." American Antiquarian Society Proceedings new series 27 (1917), pp 18–62. The early experiment in education by George Bancroft and Joseph Cogswell, 1823–1834, and why it failed.
Cogswell, Joseph Green. Outline of the System of Education at the Round Hill School: With a List of the Present Instructors and of the Pupils from its Commencement Until This Time. (Boston, 1831)

External links
Historic Northampton Reference Shelf Bibliography concerning Round Hill School.

Boarding schools in Massachusetts
Private high schools in Massachusetts
Educational institutions established in 1823
Buildings and structures in Northampton, Massachusetts
Schools in Hampshire County, Massachusetts